The Blohm & Voss Ha 142 was a German four-engined long-distance monoplane, developed to meet a Luft Hansa requirement for its transatlantic airmail service. The first of several prototypes flew on 11 October 1938 and they saw some service in other roles during the Second World War.

Design
The Ha 142 was a landing gear-equipped  version of the Blohm & Voss Ha 139 seaplane, originally developed under the company name of Hamburger Flugzeugbau. Like its predecessor, it had four engines mounted on a low inverted gull monoplane wing, high horizontal stabilizer, and a double vertical tail.

The wing center section was strengthened by a typical Blohm & Voss cross-girder which consisted of a large-diameter pipe. This transverse tube (divided internally into five sections) also acted as a fuel tank. The center wing was metal-covered while the outer wings were fabric-covered. There were six hydraulically-operated flaps in the mid-wing. The fuselage was of metal and had an approximately circular cross-section.

Each main landing gear leg had dual wheels and was fully retractable, as was the tail wheel. The landing gear was hydraulically lowered and retracted.

Four prototypes, V1 through V4, were built. These aircraft were trialed by Lufthansa and used briefly in the postal service. However, the outbreak of World War II ended further development of the civilian project.

Operations
Soon after the start of World War II, it was proposed to convert the four prototypes to long-range maritime patrol aircraft. V2 underwent a trial modification. It was fitted with an extended nose section with extensive glazing (like the Heinkel He 111 H-6), defensive armament (a 7.92 mm/.312 in MG 15 machine gun in the nose, twin-beam positions, a ventral cupola, and a powered dorsal turret), a compartment for ordnance in the fuselage, and navigation and military radio equipment. The company had by now been renamed as the Blohm & Voss aircraft division so the converted aircraft was redesignated the BV 142 V2/U1 while the V1 was similarly converted. Both were used operationally from late 1940 and were posted to the Luftwaffes second surveillance Group. This unit was assigned to the operations staff of Luftflotte III in France. However, their performance was disappointing, and after only a few missions they were withdrawn from service in 1942. Aircraft V3 and V4 were used as transport aircraft for the occupation of Denmark and in the Norway campaign with the KGr.z.b.V. 105 (Special combat team) and could transport 30 fully equipped soldiers over 4,000 km (2,490 mi). The ultimate fate of V3 and V4 is unknown. It was later planned to use the V1 and V2 to carry the Henschel GT 1200C guided torpedo, but the plan was cancelled.

Specifications (BV 142 V2/U1)

See also

References

Notes

Bibliography

 Green, William. Warplanes of the Third Reich. London: Macdonald and Jane's Publishers Ltd., 4th impression 1979, p. 86-88. .
 Smith J.Richard and Kay, Anthony. German Aircraft of the Second World War. London: Putnam & Company Ltd., 3rd impression 1978, p. 71-73. .
 Townend, David R. Clipped Wings -- World War Two Edition.  Markham: Aerofile Publications, 2010. .
 Wood, Tony and Gunston, Bill. Hitler's Luftwaffe: A pictorial history and technical encyclopedia of Hitler's air power in World War II. London: Salamander Books Ltd., 1977, p. 136. .

Ha 142
1930s German mailplanes
World War II patrol aircraft of Germany
Four-engined tractor aircraft
Inverted gull-wing aircraft
Aircraft first flown in 1938
Four-engined piston aircraft